Lah Bid (also Romanized as Lah Bīd) is a village in Dehdez Rural District, Dehdez District, Izeh County, Khuzestan Province, Iran. At the 2006 census, its population was 106, in 22 families.

References 

Populated places in Izeh County